The 2000 Jade Solid Gold Best Ten Music Awards Presentation (Chinese: 2000年度十大勁歌金曲頒獎典禮) was held on 14 January 2001. It is part of the Jade Solid Gold Best Ten Music Awards Presentation series held in Hong Kong.

Top 10 song awards
The top 10 songs (十大勁歌金曲) of 2000 are as follows.

Additional awards

References
 Top ten songs award 2000, Tvcity.tvb.com
 Additional awards 2000, Hong Kong pop music commentary association

Jade Solid Gold Best Ten Music Awards Presentation, 2000